Qamishoʿ was the Grand Metropolitan of the East and head of the Syriac Orthodox Church of the East from 578 until his death in 609.

Biography
According to Bar Hebraeus' Ecclesiastical History, Qamishoʿ was the teacher at the miaphysite (later termed Syriac Orthodox) church near the royal palace at Ctesiphon, the capital of the Sasanian Empire. After the death of the Sasanian Shahanshah Khosrow I and his succession by his son Hormizd IV, permission was granted to the miaphysites to perform an election for the office of Grand Metropolitan of the East, which had lain vacant for several years following Ahudemmeh's execution on the orders of Khosrow I in 575. Qamishoʿ was elected as Grand Metropolitan of the East at the aforementioned church aside the royal palace in 578 (AG 889).

As Grand Metropolitan of the East, Qamishoʿ ordained a number of bishops, and served until his death in 609 (AG 920). It is suggested by the historian Philip Wood that Qamishoʿ was not included in the Syriac Orthodox synaxarium as he may have collaborated with the Sasanian government during the Roman–Sasanian War of 602–628 in a manner that was later deemed unsuitable.

References
Notes

Citations

Bibliography

6th-century Oriental Orthodox archbishops
7th-century Oriental Orthodox archbishops
Maphrians
Christians in the Sasanian Empire
6th-century Iranian people
7th-century Iranian people
6th-century births
609 deaths
Year of birth unknown
6th-century Syriac Orthodox Church bishops
7th-century Syriac Orthodox Church bishops